Histioteuthis reversa, commonly known as the reverse jewel squid or the elongate jewel squid, is a species of cock-eyed squid, so called because the eyes are dissimilar. It occurs at moderate depths in the Atlantic Ocean and Mediterranean Sea and is also known from the Indian Ocean.

Description
The head bears four pairs of robust arms, a pair of tentacles and two unequal-sized eyes and the main body mass is enclosed in the mantle. The arms are less than one and a half times the length of the mantle. The outer arms are not joined to each other by a web and the inner arms are connected by a vestigial web remnant. The suckers on the arms are globular, usually with teeth on the margin, and the suckers on the terminal portion of the tentacles are in five or six rows, with larger suckers in the central rows. The mantle is cup-shaped and elongates considerably in females when they mature. The fins are a third to a half the length of the mantle and roughly half its width. The ventral (under) surface of the mantle has a complex arrangement of large and small compound light-emitting photophores, and seventeen large and one small photophore surround the right eye. In front of the left eye there are seven large photophores and the eye is ringed by ten to fourteen small ones.

Distribution
Histioteuthis reversa is native to the Atlantic Ocean and the Mediterranean Sea. It is mostly found in the northern hemisphere but also occurs off the coast of Namibia and South Africa. The northern limit of its range is the Newfoundland and the seas south of Iceland at 52° North. It does not occur in  the Gulf of Mexico and is uncommon in the Caribbean Sea. It has been recorded in the southern Indian Ocean.

Ecology
Little is known of the behaviour and ecology of this squid but it seems to breed over the continental slope as juveniles in the size range  have been found there. Adults are eaten by various cetaceans including sperm whales (Physeter macrocephalus), pygmy sperm whales (Kogia breviceps) and Risso's dolphin (Grampus griseus), a fact confirmed by examining the stomach contents of stranded animals among which the indigestible beaks of the squids are found.

References

External links

Squid
Molluscs described in 1880
Marine molluscs of Europe
Cephalopods of Europe
Taxa named by Addison Emery Verrill